Jim Young (born 1943) is former American football and Canadian football player.

Jim Young may also refer to:
James Whitney Young (born 1941), American astronomer
Jim Young (dual player) (1915–1992), Irish hurler and Gaelic footballer for Glen Rovers and Cork
Jim Young (St Finbarr's hurler), Irish hurler for St. Finbarr's and Cork
Jim Young (footballer) (1921–1988), Australian rules footballer
Jim Young (American football coach) (born 1935), American football coach
Jim Young (boat builder) (1925–2020), New Zealand sailor, boat designer and builder

See also
Jimmy Young (disambiguation)
James Young (disambiguation)